Andreas Haddeland (born 1977 is a Norwegian jazz guitarist. He was born in Sandefjord.

Discography

Solo albums 
 2014: Tilhørighet (NorCD)
 2019: Nyskudd (Tare Records)

Collaborations 
 With Legotrip
 2003: Appetite For Construction (Glamfish)

 With Line & The Lions
 2018: Mountain Solitude (Losen Records)

References

External links 

Norwegian jazz musicians
21st-century Norwegian guitarists
Norwegian jazz guitarists
Norwegian jazz composers
Male jazz composers
1977 births
Living people
Musicians from Sandefjord
21st-century Norwegian male musicians
NorCD artists